Okouzlená (English: Enchanted) is a 1942 Czechoslovak drama film directed by Otakar Vávra.

Cast
 Nataša Gollová as Lenka Bártová
 Václav Vydra as Rupert Hojtaš
 Leopolda Dostalová as Hojtašová
 Adina Mandlová as Model Milada Janská
 Marie Glázrová as Jitka Zykanová
 Karel Höger as Lawyer Pavel Chvojka
 Jan Pivec as Painter Jan Karas
 Stanislava Strobachová as Olga

References

External links
 

1942 films
1942 drama films
Czechoslovak black-and-white films
1940s Czech-language films
Czechoslovak drama films
Films directed by Otakar Vávra
1940s Czech films